Aleksandr Viktorovich Podshivalov (born 6 September 1964) is a Russian association football coach and a former player. He works as a goalkeepers coach with FC Tom Tomsk.

In the first round of the 1992–93 UEFA Cup, he saved two penalty kicks from Steve Bruce and Gary Pallister in the penalty shootout that helped his team FC Torpedo Moscow beat Manchester United F.C.

Honours
 FC Torpedo Moscow
 Soviet Premier League bronze: 1991.
 Russian Cup winner: 1993.
 Russian Goalkeeper of the Year award: 1993.
 Yukong Elephants / Bucheon Yukong / Bucheon SK
 K League runners-up : 1994
 League Cup winners : 1996

International career
Podshivalov played his only game for Russia on 6 October 1993 in a friendly against Saudi Arabia.

References

External links
 
  Profile
 

1964 births
Living people
Soviet footballers
Russian footballers
Russia international footballers
Russian expatriate footballers
Expatriate footballers in South Korea
FC Ural Yekaterinburg players
FC Ararat Yerevan players
FC Torpedo Moscow players
Soviet Top League players
Russian Premier League players
Hapoel Haifa F.C. players
Expatriate footballers in Israel
K League 1 players
Jeju United FC players
FC Lokomotiv Moscow players
Russian expatriate sportspeople in Israel
Russian expatriate sportspeople in South Korea
Liga Leumit players
Association football goalkeepers